Benita: An African Romance (alternatively titled The Spirit of Bambatse) is a novel by H. Rider Haggard.

Publication history
The novel was first published in serial form in Cassell's Magazine in the December 1905 through May 1906 issues; the first hardcover edition followed from Cassell & Company, London, 7 September 1906. Cassell reissued the title in 1920 and 1926. Subsequent British editions were published by Chariot Books in 1952 and Macdonald & Co. in 1965. An ebook edition was issued by Project Gutenberg in March 2006.

The first U.S. edition was published by Longmans, Green and Co. in 1906 under the alternate title The Spirit of Bambatse, A Romance, which was Haggard's preferred title and was used for most later American editions. The significance of the collection was recognized by its republication (also as The Spirit of Bambatse) by the Newcastle Publishing Company as the twenty-second volume of the Newcastle Forgotten Fantasy Library series in October, 1979. The Newcastle edition was reissued by Wildside Press in February 2001.

The novel has also been gathered together with Haggard's Ayesha: The Return of She (1905) into the omnibus collection Ayesha: The Return of She / Benita: An African Romance (New Orchard, 1989).

Plot
In an adventure mingling romance and the supernatural, the clairvoyant heroine Benita assists in a hunt for a lost Portuguese treasure buried in the Transvaal.

Reception
E. F. Bleiler described Benita as "a good adventure story, but without the power or depth of Haggard's other work."

Notes

External links
Complete book at Project Gutenberg
 

Novels by H. Rider Haggard
1906 British novels
1906 fantasy novels